Granary Buildings is a heritage listed building in Leeds,  West Yorkshire, England.

History
Built in around 1776 as a warehouse for the Leeds & Liverpool Canal Company, the Granary Building is a Grade II* listed building. It stands by Lock No.1 (the ”River Lock”) of the canal.

It is regarded as “an important survival from the extensive range of buildings at the end of the Leeds and Liverpool Canal at its junction with the River Aire and close to the boundary of the Aire and Calder Navigation.

The building was designed by Robert Owen, engineer for the canal company, and was unusual in that a branch of the canal ran into the building allowing loading of barges under cover.

Significant remodelling took place in the mid to late 19th century including the addition of the single-storey extension to the west. Internal timber floors were replaced with cast-iron columns and fire-proof brick arches to reduce the risk of fire.

Conversion to its current use was undertaken in the mid 1990s  including the insertion of additional windows and raising the height of the top storey to satisfy current standards for ceiling heights, work undertaken by the engineering firm Abbey Pynford. The main building served as the headquarters for Baird Group Ltd, a menswear company, until May 2021 and the later extension is Water Lane Boat House, a bar.

See also
 Architecture of Leeds
 Leeds and Liverpool Canal

References

Grade II* listed agricultural buildings
Grade II* listed industrial buildings
Industrial buildings in England
Listed buildings in Leeds
Buildings and structures in Leeds